Following is a list of Quartermaster Corps, military units, active and defunct, with logistics duties:

 Egyptian Army Quartermaster Corps - see Structure of the Egyptian Army
 Hellenic Army Quartermaster Corps (Σώμα Φροντιστών) - see Structure of the Hellenic Army
 Swedish Army Quartermaster Corps, created in 1880, amalgamated in 1966 with Swedish naval and air force components into:
 Quartermaster Corps of the Swedish Armed Forces, established in 1966, then amalgamated into the Commissary Corps of the Swedish Armed Forces in 1973
 Quartermaster Corps (United States Army), established in 1775 and the United States Army's oldest logistics branch

Lists of military units and formations